Kim Min-jae (Hangul: 김민재, Hanja: 金敏宰; born January 3, 1973) is a coach for the Doosan Bears in the Korea Baseball Organization. Previously, Kim was a shortstop for the Lotte Giants, SK Wyverns and Hanwha Eagles. He batted and threw right-handed.

Professional career 

Kim graduated from Busan Technical High School in 1991. He was then signed by the Lotte Giants, and played for the Giants for eleven seasons. In 2002, Kim moved to the SK Wyverns. After the 2005 season his contract with the Wyverns ran out and he became a free agent. Before the 2006 season Kim signed with the Hanwha Eagles for four-year.

Since Kim was considered one of the best defensive infielders in the KBO league, he had been regularly picked for the South Korea national baseball team as a utility infielder.

In October 2002, Kim got first called up to the national squad, and competed in the Asian Games. He helped his team defend the gold medal, going 4-for-8 with 3 RBIs. A month later, Kim was joined in the South Korea national team again for the 2002 Intercontinental Cup held in Havana, Cuba.

In 2006, he was selected for the South Korea national baseball team, and participated in the 2006 World Baseball Classic. Kim went 3-for-5 with an RBI over Team USA in Round 2. He hit a one-bounce ground rule double over the left field off setup man Dan Wheeler with two outs in the fourth inning, and smacked an RBI single off Mike Timlin in the sixth. At the last match of Round 2 against Team Japan, Kim drew a one-out walk in the eighth off Toshiya Sugiuchi and scored the tiebreaking run when Lee Jong-beom hit a two-RBI double.

In December 2007, Kim played for South Korea again at the Asian Baseball Championship held in Taichung, Taiwan. He went 3-for-3 with 3 RBIs, playing shortstop and second base during the competition.

On July 16, 2008, Kim was named to the South Korea national baseball team for the 2008 Summer Olympics. Due to right ankle injury, he was mainly used as a substitute infielder or first base coach during the Olympics. But in the team's seventh game in the round-robin, against the Netherlands, Kim drew a two-out walk in the fifth off Alexander Smit and scored a run when Kim Hyun-soo hit a two-RBI single.

Kim retired for good as a player after the 2009 season but retained his assistant coaching position in the Eagles.

Notable international careers

References

External links 
Career statistics and player information from Korea Baseball Organization

1973 births
Living people
Sportspeople from Busan
Hanwha Eagles coaches
Doosan Bears coaches
KT Wiz coaches
Lotte Giants coaches
Baseball players at the 2008 Summer Olympics
2006 World Baseball Classic players
Olympic gold medalists for South Korea
Olympic baseball players of South Korea
Hanwha Eagles players
SSG Landers players
Lotte Giants players
KBO League shortstops
South Korean baseball coaches
South Korean baseball players
Olympic medalists in baseball
Asian Games medalists in baseball
Medalists at the 2008 Summer Olympics
Baseball players at the 2002 Asian Games
Asian Games gold medalists for South Korea
Medalists at the 2002 Asian Games